The 1929 State of the Union Address was given by Herbert Hoover, the 31st United States President on Tuesday, December 3, 1929, to both houses of the 71st United States Congress. This is  the first State of the Union Address that Herbert Hoover would give to the Congress, and the 1929 Stock Market Crash had just begun.
He said,
 "The test of the rightfulness of our decisions must be whether we have sustained and advanced the ideals of the American people; self-government in its foundations of local government; justice whether to the individual or to the group; ordered liberty; freedom from domination; open opportunity and equality of opportunity; the initiative and individuality of our people; prosperity and the lessening of poverty; freedom of public opinion; education; advancement of knowledge; the growth of religious spirit; the tolerance of all faiths; the foundations of the home and the advancement of peace."

References

State of the Union addresses
Presidency of Herbert Hoover
71st United States Congress
State of the Union Address
State of the Union Address
1929 documents
December 1929 events
State of the Union